Bellusci is an Italian surname. Notable people with the surname include:

Giuseppe Bellusci (born 1989), Italian footballer
Giuseppe Salvatore Bellusci (1888–1972), Italian politician
Michael Bellusci (born 1960), American musician

See also
Bellucci

Italian-language surnames